2023 in television may refer to
 2023 in American television for television related events in the United States.
 List of 2023 American television debuts for television debut related events in the United States.
 2023 in Australian television for television related events in Australia.
 2023 in British television for television related events in Great Britain.
 2023 in Scottish television for television related events in Scotland.
 2023 in Canadian television for television related events in Canada.
 2023 in Irish television for television related events in Ireland.
 2023 in Philippine television for television related events in the Philippines.
 2023 in South Korean television for television related events in South Korea.
 2023 in Tamil television for television related events in Tamil.

 

2023 in television
Mass media timelines by year